John Culp is a professor who works at the Azusa Pacific University in the Department of Philosophy. He specializes in the philosophy of religion, history of philosophy and Wesleyan theology. He has written for the Stanford Encyclopedia of Philosophy.

Education
Claremont Graduate University, PhD
Butler University, M.A
Asbury Theological Seminar, M.Div.
Greenville College, B.A

Publications
Panentheism (Stanford Encyclopedia of Philosophy)

References

Year of birth missing (living people)
Living people
American philosophers
Azusa Pacific University faculty